INSACOG (Indian SARS-CoV-2 Consortium on Genomics or  Indian SARS-CoV-2 Genetics Consortium) is the forum set up under the Ministry of Health and Family Welfare by the Government of India on 30 December 2020, to study and monitor genome sequencing and virus variation of circulating strains of COVID-19 in India. Initially it was tasked to study the virus variant Lineage B.1.1.7 earlier found in United Kingdom in December 2020.

INSACOG works as a consortium of 38 national laboratories for genome sequencing located in different parts of India. All these 10 laboratories are required to share 5% of positive samples to INSACOG for further research and studies. A National Centre for Disease Control (NCDC) nodal unit maintain a database of all samples of the new variants. Two national genomic sequencing database centers are appointed 1) National Institute of Biomedical Genomics and 2) CSIR Institute of Genomics and Integrative Biology. In its early research INSACOG identefied virus variant Lineage B.1.617 referred to as a double mutation variant.

See also
GISAID

References 

COVID-19 pandemic in India
Scientific organisations based in India
Genomics
Bioinformatics organizations
Council of Scientific and Industrial Research
Biological research institutes
Ministry of Health and Family Welfare